The Liberal-Progressive Party of Manitoba fielded a full slate of fifty-seven candidates in the 1959 provincial election. The party elected eleven members, retaining their status as the official opposition in the Legislative Assembly of Manitoba.

Candidates

Source: Historical summaries, Elections Manitoba, pp. 296–297; candidate names taken from the Canadian Parliamentary Guide (1960).

Candidates in subsequent by-elections

References

Liberal-Progressive Party candidates in Manitoba provincial elections